The 1984 season of the African Cup Winners' Cup football club tournament was won by Al Ahly in two-legged final victory against Leventis United. This was the eleventh season that the tournament took place for the winners of each African country's domestic cup. Thirty-five sides entered the competition, with Racing Club de Bobo withdrawing before the 1st leg of the first round.

Preliminary round

|}

1:Waxool FC were disqualified for fielding an ineligible player

First round

|}

1:Following crowd trouble at the end of the 2nd leg, CS Imana were forced to rename themselves DC Motema Pembe by CAF.

Second round

|}

Quarterfinals

|}

Semifinals

{{TwoLegResult|Al Ahly|Egypt|1|Al-Nasr'|Libya|—|—|var2=1977}}
|}

1:Al-Nasr withdrew before the 1st leg for political reasons (refusing to play Egyptian teams).

Final

|}

Champions

External links
 Results available on CAF Official Website
 Cup Winners' Cup 1985 - rsssf.org''

African Cup Winners' Cup
2